Aghinagh GAA is a Gaelic Athletic Association club located in the village of Rusheen, County Cork, Ireland. The club currently fields teams in Gaelic football.

History

Although there is reference to an Aghinagh team taking part in the Cork Senior Hurling Championship in the 1890s, the club in its current form was founded in January 1949. The club was originally called St. Augustine's and adopted royal blue and white as their official colours. A juvenile section of the club was established in 1969. In the early years of its existence, Aghinagh depended on the goodwill of farmers to provide suitable fields for pitches. In 1984 the club bought six and a half acres of land near the village of Rusheen. In subsequent years this site was developed and dressing rooms were built. The pitch was officially opened in 1988.

Honours

Mid Cork Junior A Football Championship: 2021

References

External links
Aghinagh GAA site

Gaelic games clubs in County Cork
Gaelic football clubs in County Cork